The Criminal Procedure and Investigations Act 1996 or CPIA  is a piece of statutory legislation in the United Kingdom that regulates the procedures of investigating and prosecution of criminal offences.

Provisions

Part I: Disclosure
Following a section of introductory text, the act outlines the relevance of its content in the first section to persons charged with a summary offence, indictable offence or one that is triable either way, as well as the criminal investigation into such an offence and as to whether such a person should be charged with the offence or found guilty of it once charged. It details the procedures for disclosure and continued disclosure by the prosecution to the defence any information "which is in the prosecutor’s possession, and came into his possession in connection with the case for the prosecution against the accused." It also defines a defence statement, defence witnesses and the means by which they should be interviewed, and confidentiality of disclosed information, and other statutory and common law rules of a court.

Part II: Criminal Investigations 
The second part of the act defines a criminal investigation as "an investigation conducted by police officers with a view to it being ascertained whether a person should be charged with an offence, or whether a person charged with an offence is guilty of it." It outlines the codes of practice for any investigation set out by the Secretary of State and the means by which such a code could be revised.

Part III: Preparatory Hearings

Part IV: Rulings

Part V: Committal, Transfer etc.

Part VII: Miscellaneous and General (chapter 54 to 81)

Section 54
Section 54 of the act includes the follow administration of justice offences:
The offence of perverting the course of justice
The offence under section 51(1) of the Criminal Justice and Public Order Act 1994
An offence of aiding, abetting, counselling, procuring, suborning or inciting another person to commit an offence under section 1 of the Perjury Act 1911.

Cases

Environmental protesters charged with conspiracy to commit aggravated trespass
In 2009, twenty six environmental protesters were pre-emptively arrested and later charged with conspiracy to commit aggravated trespass. It was claimed that Ratcliffe-on-Soar power station was the intended target. In 2011, their cases were quashed when it was revealed police withheld recordings made by undercover police officer Mark Kennedy. Non-disclosure to the Crown Prosecution Service and defence teams is a breach of the act.

References

United Kingdom Acts of Parliament 1996
Criminal law of the United Kingdom